André-Marie or André Marie is a French compound given name. Notable people with the name include:

 André Marie, French Radical politician.
 André Marie Constant Duméril (1774-1860), a French zoologist
 André Marie Jean Jacques Dupin (1783-1865), a French advocate
 André-Marie Ampère (1775-1836), a French physicist
 André-Marie Mbida (1917-1980), the first Prime Minister of pre-independent Cameroon

See also
 André-Jean-François-Marie
 Jean-Marie André
 Marie-Andrée

French masculine given names
Compound given names